The 2018 Golden Globe Race was an around-the-world sailing race founded by Australian adventurer and circumnavigator, Don McIntyre. The race started on 1 July 2018 from Les Sables-d'Olonne, France as the second edition and 50th anniversary celebration of the original Sunday Times Golden Globe Race. It featured yachts similar to those used at that time. Except for safety equipment, no modern technology was allowed.

Retro sailing
Entrants are limited to sailing similar yachts and equipment to what was available to Sir Robin Knox-Johnston, the winner of the original race in 1968–69. That means sailing without the use of modern technology such as satellite based navigation aids. Safety equipment such as EPIRBs and AIS are carried, however the competitors are only allowed to use the technology in an emergency.

Competitors could apply to have their class of boat approved, providing it was in accordance with the following rules:

 Of fibre reinforced plastic construction.
 Designed prior to 1988 and have a minimum series of 20 yachts built from one mould.
Bowsprits, wind vanes and outboard rudders, boomkins, pushpits and pulpits are not measured.
 Have full-length keels with rudders attached to the trailing edge.
 A minimum design displacement of 

Twenty-two boats were approved, with one exception to the rules made for a wood-epoxy Suhaili replica (the Suhaili being the yacht that Knox-Johnston sailed in 1968).

Route
The race started on 1 July 2018 in Les Sables-d'Olonne and led around the world eastward, leaving Cape of Good Hope, Cape Leeuwin and Cape Horn to port. There were several "film gates" along the route, where the skippers could be interviewed as they sailed past without stopping and where they passed over films and letters.

Entrants
18 entrants from 13 different countries entered the race. Of those, six chose the class-compliant but relatively modern Rustler 36. A further 17 had expressed interest but never started.

* Adjusted for displacement per Dave Gerr's formula

The race
The race started at 10:00 GMT on 1 July 2018, with the competitors passing a rolling gate between the Suhaili and the Joshua, two yachts that competed in the 1968 race. Sir Robin Knox-Johnston, who sailed on the Suhaili and won that race, fired the starting cannon.

Of the 18 entrants, Francesco Cappelletti did not start the race and officially withdrew on 5 July. He plans to sail around the world independently and the race organisers are tracking his progress. Ertan Beskardes retired on 5 July, after deciding that being unable to communicate with his family removed the enjoyment from the race. Kevin Farebrother retired on 15 July at the Canary Islands mark, after becoming disillusioned by solo sailing and lack of sleep. Two days later, Nabil Amra retired at the same area on 17 July due to broken windvane gear. Antoine Cousot stopped at the Canary islands to repair his windvane gear, demoting him to the 'Chichester' class (one stop). Istvan Kopar put in to the Cape Verde islands on 23 July, planning to replace his windvane, but in the event proceeded without assistance.

Antoine Cousot retired at the end of August due to a broken windvane and injuries. Philippe Péché made one stop ('Chichester' class) on 11 August following the failure of his tiller, but retired from the race two weeks later on 25 August.

Are Wiig was dismasted on 17 August 400 nautical miles off Cape Town.

Abhilash Tomy was dismasted and injured on 22 September. Gregor McGuckin elected to abandon his boat after being dismasted and was rescued with Abhilash.

She was rescued by the cargo ship Tian Fu on 7 December.

Golden Globe Race 2022 

The 2022 edition of the Golden Globe Race started on 4 September 2022 from Les Sables-d'Olonne in France. Like in 2018, the solo-sailors gathered for the SITraN Prologue, starting 14 August 2022, before sailing to Les Sables-d'Olonne for the GGR Race Village.

References

External links
 Official website

Golden Globe Race
Golden Globe Race
Golden Globe Race